St. Uriel's Episcopal Church, also known as Church of St. Uriel the Archangel, or simply St. Uriel's, is an Anglo-Catholic Episcopal church in Sea Girt, New Jersey. The church is an operating member of the Anglican Communion, and adheres to the Catholic and Orthodox traditions of Anglicanism. A history of the church by James B. Simpson entitled Regent of the Sun was published in 1988, on the occasion of the 85th anniversary of its founding.

The parish banner was made by the Sisters of Bethany and dedicated at the church in 1958. Until that year, the church in Sea Girt was the only Anglican house of worship dedicated to the Archangel Uriel. It remains the only Episcopal church in the United States named after Saint Uriel the Archangel.

References

External links
 

20th-century Episcopal church buildings
Episcopal church buildings in New Jersey
Churches in Monmouth County, New Jersey
Anglo-Catholic church buildings in the United States
Christian organizations established in 1904
Uriel